Dawon is either a lion or a tiger that serves as the mount of the goddess Durga in some Hindu traditions. Dawon is rewarded as a battle-mount to the goddess by other deities, though it does not appear in any mainstream Hindu texts. As Durga fights with ten weapons wielded on her arms, Dawon is believed to serve its mistress, attacking her foes with its claws and fangs.

Dawon has often been represented in traditional and ancient Bengali culture and Indian culture in the form of Ghatokbahini, i.e. in the form of a half-lion, half-tiger hybrid. It is a sacred tiger in Tibetan lore, and was later known as 'Gdon.

See also
 Durga
 Vahana
 Shesha

References 

cz:Dawon

Hindu legendary creatures
Mythological lions